The Jinan Great Southern Mosque is the oldest mosque in the city of Jinan, Shandong Province, China. It was established during the Yuan dynasty (in 1295). Most of the present structures were erected during the Ming dynasty (in 1436 and 1492). The basic layout of the mosque is that of a Chinese temple into which the elements needed for its function as a mosque have been integrated.

History
According to legend, the Great Southern Mosque was founded during the Tang dynasty, but there are no known records to confirm this. The written record dates the establishment of the mosque at its present site to the year 1295, during the first year of the reign of Temür Khan (Emperor Chengzong of Yuan).

Construction of the present day structures started in the 1420s and 1430s. Significant expansions were undertaken in the year 1492, the fifth year in the reign of the Hongzhi Emperor. Other recorded renovations followed during the reigns of the Jiajing (1521–1567)  and Wanli (1572–1620) Emperors of the Ming dynasty, the Jiaqing (1796–1820), Daoguang (1820–1850), and Tongzhi (1861–1875) Emperors of the Qing dynasty, as well as during the early Republican era.

The mosque was damaged severely during the Cultural Revolution with many of the historical artifacts it housed being destroyed and the building converted into a factory. Since 1992, it has been protected as a provincial-level key cultural heritage site.

Architecture
The basic layout of the mosque follows the courtyard style of a traditional Chinese temple with major buildings arranged along a main axis of symmetry. However, whereas in a Chinese temple, this main axis is typically oriented in the north-south direction, the main axis of the Great Southern Mosque is oriented in the east-west direction so that upon entering the main prayer hall one faces west (towards Mecca).

In keeping with Chinese tradition, the main entrance of the mosque is protected by a spirit wall.

In total, the mosque covers an area of 6,630 square meters of which 2,830 square meters are covered by buildings.

Location
The mosque is located in Lixia District of Jinan, to the west of the historical city center and the Baotu Spring Park. Its location is at the southern entrance to Jinan's Muslim quarter (Huimin Xiaoqu).

See also
 Islam in China
 List of mosques in China
 List of sites in Jinan
 Timeline of Islamic history
 Islamic architecture
 Islamic art

References

1295 establishments in Asia
13th-century establishments in China
13th-century mosques
Buildings and structures in Jinan
Mosques in China
Religious buildings and structures completed in 1492
Tourist attractions in Jinan
Religion in Shandong
Yuan dynasty architecture